Free Flight or freeflight can refer to:

Flight
 Free flight (air traffic control)
 Free flight (model aircraft)
Music
 Free Flight (band), an American jazz band led by Jim Walker
Freeflight (album)

See also
Free fall (disambiguation)